Pelu (or variants) may refer to:

Arts, entertainment, and media
 La Pelu, a 2013 Argentine humoristic program
 Little Fluffy Gigolo Pelu, a Japanese manga series

People

Surname
 John Pelu (born 1982), Swedish former professional football
 Piero Pelù (born 1962), Italian singer and songwriter
 Samsul Pelu (born 1995), Indonesian professional football player

Given name
 Pelu Awofeso, Nigerian journalist, travel and culture writer
 Pelu Taele (born 1981), New Zealand international rugby union footballer